Jonathan Richard Ellis  (born 1 July 1946) is a British theoretical physicist who is currently Clerk Maxwell Professor of Theoretical Physics at King's College London.

After completing his secondary education at Highgate School, he attended King's College, Cambridge, earning his PhD in theoretical (high-energy) particle physics in 1971. After brief post-doc positions in the SLAC Theory Group and Caltech, he went to CERN and has held an indefinite contract there since 1978. He was awarded the Maxwell Medal and the Paul Dirac Prize by the Institute of Physics in 1982 and 2005 respectively, and is an Elected Fellow of the Royal Society of London since 1985 and of the Institute of Physics since 1991. He was awarded an Honorary Doctorate from the University of Southampton, and twice won the First Award in the Gravity Research Foundation essay competition (in 1999 and 2005). He is also Honorary Doctor at Uppsala University.

Ellis' activities at CERN are wide-ranging. He was twice Deputy Division Leader for the theory ("TH") division, and served as Division Leader for 1988–1994. He was a founding member of the LEPC and of the LHCC; currently he is chair of the committee to investigate physics opportunities for future proton accelerators, and is a member of the extended CLIC (Compact Linear Collider) Steering Committee.

Ellis was appointed Commander of the Order of the British Empire (CBE) in the 2012 Birthday Honours for services to science and technology.

Scientific research

Ellis' research interests focus on the phenomenological aspects of particle physics, though he has also made important contributions to astrophysics and cosmology and quantum gravity.  Most of his publications relate directly to experiment, from interpreting measurements and the results of searches for new particles, to exploring the physics that could be done with future accelerators.  He was one of the pioneers of research at the interface between particle physics and cosmology, which has since become a sub-specialty of its own: particle astrophysics.

Ellis' early research accomplishments are centred on the phenomenology of gauge theories.  Working with Dimitri Nanopoulos and Mary Gaillard, he proposed in 1976 the so-called "Higgs-strahlung" process in which a Higgs boson is radiated from a Z-boson (this proved to be the best way to search for the Higgs boson at the Large Electron–Positron Collider), and in the same year estimated the direct CP-violation contribution to rare neutral kaon decays (which led to the success of the NA31 and NA48 experiments at CERN).  Also in 1976, he published two papers suggesting techniques for finding the gluon in  annihilations. The following year he predicted the mass of the bottom quark on the basis of Grand Unified Theory, before this quark was observed in experiment.  In 1978 he published a frequently cited general paper on such theories, with Andrzej J. Buras, Gaillard and Nanopoulos.

In the 1980s, Ellis became a leading advocate of models of supersymmetry.  In one of his earliest works, he showed that the lightest supersymmetric particle is a natural dark matter candidate. In 1991, he showed that radiative corrections to the mass of the lightest Higgs boson in minimal supersymmetric models increased that mass beyond the reach of the Large Electron–Positron Collider (LEP) searches. More generally, Ellis and collaborators pioneered the analysis of so-called "benchmark scenarios" meant to illustrate the range of phenomenology to be expected from supersymmetric models; such analyses have played a major role in evaluating the promise of various future accelerator options.

In parallel to his investigations of supersymmetric phenomenology, Ellis has also advocated phenomenological probes of quantum gravity and string theory.  These probes include direct tests of quantum mechanics with the CPLEAR Collaboration and the derivation of Grand Unified Theories from string theory.  In this vein, his work on tests of the constancy of the velocity of light and models of string cosmology received separate prizes from the Gravity Research Foundation.

An impression of the impact of Ellis' research can be obtained from the INSPIRE-HEP reference system for scientific papers in particle physics and related fields.  As of 2015, this data base lists over 1,000 scientific papers of which he is an author; altogether the sum of citations is above 60,000.  In 2004 a SPIRES survey ranked him as the second-most cited theoretical physicist. His publications include three papers with over 1000 citations, eight more with over 500 citations, and over 100 other papers with at least 100 citations each. With Daniele Amati, he edited the 2000 book Quantum Reflections (a collection of articles by various physicists on the philosophy and conceptualization of quantum theory).

Support of particle accelerator projects

In addition to his theoretical research, John Ellis has been an advocate and supporter of future accelerators, beginning with LEP and the LHC, and extending to Compact Linear Collider (CLIC), photon colliders, and future proton accelerators.  Naturally his theoretical work reflected these connections, as when he showed that data from the Stanford Linear Collider (SLC) and from LEP could be used to predict the masses of the top quark and the Higgs boson.  Such predictions are now a mainstream activity within particle physics, and constitute one of the most important bridges between the experimental and theoretical communities.

Concerning the LHC, Ellis played a leading role in the seminal 1984 workshop on physics to be done with such an accelerator.  Since then he has written many articles on searches for Higgs bosons and supersymmetric particles at the LHC, both for the particle physics community and at a more popular level.    His most recent LHC physics review appeared in a Nature Insight supplement on 19 July 2007.

John Ellis has been a strong supporter of the CLIC option for a future high-energy  linear collider; this option is pursued most strongly at CERN.  He was convenor of the CLIC Physics Study Group that produced the main report on this option, in 2004.

Awards and honours 
In June 2020 Ellis was appointed an honorary fellow of the Institute of Physics (IoP) for his “outstanding work in theoretical particle physics and cosmology, his encouragement and support of countries across the world to work with CERN and his outreach work inspiring the public.”

Outreach and spreading physics around the world 

Ellis is regularly invited to give public lectures on particle physics and related topics. In the two-year period 2004–5, he gave public lectures in Geneva (in French), in Granada and Barcelona (in Spanish), in Rome (in Italian) and in Warsaw (in English). He recently gave a speech about the future of Physics beyond the Higgs boson in València (in English). While at CERN he often gives introductory talks to visitors, ranging from official delegations from the United Kingdom to physics teachers at the high-school level.

Ellis is known for his efforts to involve non-European nations in CERN scientific activities.  In the context of the LHC, he has interacted frequently with physicists, administrators at universities and institutes, and ministers of funding agencies and diplomatic corps from a wide variety of countries, ranging from major CERN partners like the United States, Russia, Japan, Canada, India, Israel, Armenia and China, to states with nascent physics programs such as Azerbaijan, the Baltic republics, Bolivia, Colombia, Croatia, Cyprus, Iran, Madagascar, New Zealand, Pakistan, Romania, Sri Lanka, Vietnam, and lately in Palestine and Rwanda, and many others.  These interactions have fostered the international character of CERN and opened the pathways of scientific discourse all around the world.

In 2014, Ellis delivered an address about his experiences at CERN at the second Starmus Festival in the Canary Islands. Ellis is a regular panellist at HowTheLightGetsIn, the music and philosophy festival hosted each year in Hay-on-Wye.

References

External links 
 Oral history interview transcript with John Ellis on 6 May 2021, American Institute of Physics, Niels Bohr Library & Archives
 Ellis discusses the supercollider at CERN, and the physics discoveries that could come from it
 "The LHC is safe", talk given by John Ellis at CERN, in Geneva, on 14 August 2008
 International Man of Mysteries,  September 10, 2008 (Interview with John Ellis)
 Open Knowledge Conference plenary talk, on 17 September 2013
"Bang Goes the Big Bang" – Ellis debates the origins of the universe with Roger Penrose and Laura Mersini-Houghton
Scientific publications of John Ellis on INSPIRE-HEP

1946 births
Living people
English physicists
20th-century British physicists
21st-century British physicists
People associated with CERN
People educated at Highgate School
Alumni of King's College, Cambridge
Academics of King's College London
Commanders of the Order of the British Empire
Fellows of the Royal Society
Foreign Fellows of the Indian National Science Academy
Maxwell Medal and Prize recipients
Theoretical physicists
Fellows of King's College London